The Calvana is a cattle breed from Tuscany, in central Italy. It is particularly associated with the Calvana region in the provinces of Florence and Prato, but is also raised in the provinces of Pistoia and Siena. It was previously considered a type within the Chianina breed, but is now recognised as a separate breed. A herdbook was opened in 1985. It is one of the 16 minor Italian cattle breeds of limited diffusion recognised and protected by the Ministero delle Politiche Agricole Alimentari e Forestali, the Italian ministry of agriculture.

Uses
The Calvana was in the past raised as a dual-purpose breed, for meat and as a draught animal; it is now raised exclusively for meat. Animals are slaughtered between 15 and 21 months old, when they weigh 500–700 kg; average yield is 59.2%, slightly lower than that of the Chianina.

External links
 Calvana cattle video

References

Ark of Taste foods